Southern Sporting Union, also known as SSU, is an Indian professional football club based in Imphal, Manipur. It participates in Manipur State League, top division football league in Manipur.

Honours

Domestic Tournaments 

 Shahid Manoranjan Memorial Tournament
 Champions (1): 2021
 Tiddim Invitation Football Trophy
 Champions (1): 2005
 Churachand Singh Trophy
 Champions (4): 2001, 2003–04, 2005–06, 2006
 Runners-up (4): 1985, 1986, 2014–15, 2019

See also
 List of football clubs in Manipur
 Sports in Manipur

References 

Football clubs in Manipur
Association football clubs established in 1977
1977 establishments in Manipur
Imphal